

The Farman F.230 and its derivatives were a family of light touring aircraft built in France in the 1930s. They were low-wing cantilever monoplanes of conventional configuration, with fixed tailskid undercarriage and two open cockpits in tandem. The thick-section wing used on these designs was a distinguishing feature.

A Farman F.231 was featured in the Cigars of the Pharaoh, the fourth volume of The Adventures of Tintin comics series by Belgian cartoonist Hergé.

Operational history

During the course of the 1930s decade, aircraft of this family held various world records in their class for speed, altitude, duration, and distance; the F.356 model alone held no fewer than 18 such records.

Typical of these exploits was Marcel Lalouette and Jean de Permangle's long-distance flight on 12 January 1931, where they flew an F.231 from Istres, France, to Villa Cisneros, in colonial West Africa during which they covered 2,700 km (1,690 mi) in 22 hours and set a new distance record. In another feat, Jean Réginensi and André Bailly set three world airspeed records in October 1933 (over 100 km, 500 km, and 1,000 km) flying a F.239.

Variants

F.230
 F.230 - initial version with Salmson 9Ad engine (11 built)
 F.230bis - conversion of F.230 (1 converted)
 F.231 - version with Renault 4Pb engine (47 built)
 F.231bis - seaplane version of F.231 (1 converted)
 F.232 - version with Michel IV-AT3 engine (4 built)
 F.233 - version with de Havilland Gipsy I engine (1 built)
 F.234 - version with Salmson 7Ac engine (16 built)
 F.235 - version with Hispano-Suiza 6Pa engine (1 built)
 F.236 - version with Salmson 9Ad engine (4 built)
 F.237 - similar to the F.235, but powered by a 100-hp (75-kW) Renault engine.
 F.238 - version with de Havilland Gipsy III engine (1 built)
 F.239 - version with Pobjoy R engine (1 built)

F.350

 F.350 - version with Renault 4Pb engine (2 built, plus 4 converted from F.231)
 F.351 - version with Renault 4Pb engine and enclosed cabin (1 built, plus 1 converted from F.231)
 F.352 - version with Salmson 7Ac engine (1 built, plus 1 converted from F.234)
 F.352H - seaplane version of F.352 (1 built, plus 1 converted from F.234)
 F.353 - version with de Havilland Gipsy III engine (1 built)
 F.354 - version with de Havilland Gipsy I engine (1 built)
 F.355 - version with Renault 4Pdi engine (1 built)
 F.356 - version with Renault 4Pc engine (1 built)
 F.357 - version with Renault 4Pdi engine (1 built)
 F.358 - version with Hispano-Suiza 6Pa engine (1 built)
 F.359 - version with de Havilland Gipsy III engine (1 built)

F.360
 F.360 - version with Salmson 9Ad engine (1 built)
 F.361 - version with Salmson 9Adr engine (2 converted from F.236)

Operators

 Spanish Republican Air Force F.350

Specifications (F.231)

See also

References

Bibliography

External links
 aviafrance.com

1930s French sport aircraft
F.0230
Low-wing aircraft
Single-engined tractor aircraft
Aircraft first flown in 1930